"Secret Love" is the first single from Stevie Nicks' seventh studio album In Your Dreams released on May 3, 2011. It is her first original single in ten years. "Secret Love" was released on January 13, 2011 via digital download.

Nicks originally wrote the song in 1976 and recorded a demo for Fleetwood Mac's 1977 album, Rumours, but it did not make the cut for the album.

Music video
The music video was directed by David A. Stewart, who produced the In Your Dreams album, and filmed in Nicks' house and backyard. Nicks' goddaughter Kelly appears in the video wearing a vintage dress that Nicks wore on stage in 1976. According to Nicks, Kelly portrays the young Stevie Nicks blending with the soul of Nicks' 62-year-old self.

Charts

References

Stevie Nicks songs
Songs written by Stevie Nicks
2011 songs